Green Bay Voyageurs FC were an American soccer team based in Ashwaubenon, Wisconsin. Founded in 2018, the team was a member of the USL League Two. The team was owned by Big Top Soccer, who also owns Forward Madison FC of USL League One, and their managing director is Peter Wilt, the former general manager of the Chicago Fire.

History
The team was officially announced in October 2018. The Voyageurs name and colours were announced on February 9, 2019, at Green Bay Distillery. Fans were given the opportunity to suggest a name for the team in October, with Voyageurs being the most-submitted team name. The club's logo was designed by Matthew Wolff.

The Voyageurs won their debut game 3–0 over WSA Winnipeg on the morning of June 1, 2019. The game, postponed by rain from the previous day, was the inaugural event held at Capital Credit Union Park. 

On April 12, 2021, the Voyageurs announced a partnership with Forward Madison to develop and identify players on the Voyageurs's roster that could go pro with the Flamingos.

On January 25, 2022, the team suspended operations for the 2022 season.

Players and staff 
The Voyageurs announced their first-ever player, Northern Illinois University forward Nick Markanich, in February 2019.

Current roster
.

Year-by-year

Staff

References

Association football clubs established in 2018
USL League Two teams
2018 establishments in Wisconsin
Soccer clubs in Wisconsin
Sports in Green Bay, Wisconsin
Forward Madison FC